This is a list of episodes of You Can't Do That on Television, a Canadian live-action variety sketch show that offers a subversive spin on specific topics as filtered through the lives of pre-teens and teenagers. The show was in production from 1979 to 1990. No episodes were produced in 1980 and 1988.

Episode list

Season 1 (1979)

These were hour-long episodes aired locally on Saturday mornings on CJOH-TV in Ottawa, Ontario, Canada and were a mixture of prerecorded comedy sketches and mostly live link scenes, along with phone-in contests, music videos, disco dancing contests, and interviews. These early episodes also sported great prize giveaways like a portable television set, a Panasonic radio, and vinyl albums. Until March 2013, only three episodes from this season were known to exist in their entirety.  In March 2013, information and photos from the "missing" episodes were provided to www.ycdtotv.com, and in June 2013, the episodes themselves were uploaded to YouTube. They have since been removed.

Season 2 (1981 (Canada); 1982 (United States)
This season originally had the same format as the 1979 episodes (except that the disco dancing segments were replaced with video game contests).  However, beginning with this season, each episode had a specific theme along with a "preempted show" intro. In addition, half-hour versions were made for national and international syndication.  The "international" versions of these episodes composed the first season of the series to air on Nickelodeon, although slightly different versions were made to be shown in Canada. Many scenes (including slime, water and pie scenes) were also reshot for the syndicated versions to remove local Ottawa or specifically Canadian references; the reshot scenes are often easy to spot because the kids often sported longer hair. This seasons' first seven episodes were released on iTunes on December 17, 2012. At the end of the Smoking episode, McGlade gave a special acknowledgement to Lye, who never smoked in real life, for doing so much smoking during the episode. He greatly appreciated the acknowledgement, and also said he'd never smoke again. (He would be forced to, however, in filming the 1989 "Smoking" episode.)

In addition to airing on Nickelodeon, the half-hour edits of this season's episodes were also broadcast locally on CJOH starting in January 1982. To make up for the lack of local content, the show's cast and crew made a new, local-only program, Something Else, to preserve the variety-show and local-interest segments that had been part of the original YCDTOTV. Something Else aired Saturday mornings on CJOH immediately following the YCDTOTV reruns. Christine also sported her natural hair (cut short and dyed with pink highlights), rather than the wigs she'd be forced to wear during the 1982 season of YCDTOTV.

Season 3 (1982)
This is the first season in which each episode was made in the half-hour format and produced specifically for Nickelodeon.  With many of the regulars from the 1981 season having grown too old for the show, this season saw the additions of several new cast members, including Alasdair Gillis, Vanessa Lindores, Elizabeth Richardson and Doug Ptolemy, and Abby Hagyard as the series' token adult female to play opposite Les Lye.  Also, host Christine McGlade wore wigs throughout the season in order to hide her natural hair, which had been cut short and dyed with pink highlights. CTV would also give the show a second try on the network in the fall of 1982, airing once a week on Saturday mornings.

Season 4 (1983-1984)
1983 marked the last season for regulars Brodie Osome and Martin Kerr, but the show welcomed newcomer Justin Cammy. With video-game arcades rising in popularity, Blip's Arkaid was added to the roster of skits this season. In late 1983, the original 28 minute episodes were cut by 3 minutes when Nickelodeon started allowing outside advertising. The first ten 1983 episodes were the last episodes to be shown in the 28 minute format.

Season 5 (1984-1985)
Because the show had become Nickelodeon's highest-rated television series and provided extra funding to CJOH, the 1984 season saw double the number of episodes produced, with 26 instead of the usual 13 seen in the seasons prior. New regulars Stephanie Chow, Adam Kalbfleisch, Ben Schreiner, Pauline Kerr (sister of former cast member Martin Kerr) and Marjorie Silcoff, were introduced this season, while future regular Adam Reid appeared for the first time in a brief, non-speaking role, and Angie Coddett, Kevin Kubusheskie, Luke McKeehan, and Klea Scott gave their final performances. One of Les Lye's most popular characters, the school bus driver Snake Eyes, made his debut this season.

Season 6 (1985)
To prepare for the departure of long-time host Christine McGlade, Alasdair Gillis became a co-host alongside her. Adam Reid became a new regular cast member, while Lisa Ruddy began her last season on the show.  This was also the final season with Blip's Arkaid, as home video game systems had begun to eclipse video arcades in popularity.

Season 7 (1986-1987)
While still in its height popularity-wise, the 1986 season saw many changes for the show. Most notably, long-time host Christine McGlade  and fan favorite Alasdair Gillis would both leave, and frequent director Geoffrey Darby would be replaced by Brenda Mason, who would go on to direct the remaining episodes of the show's "original run". The season also began to see the show's dark comedy shift from black comedy more towards "gross-out humour", featuring characters getting dumped on with pig manure (Vanessa), elephant dung (Alasdair & Vanessa), vomit (James, Stephanie), and toilet water (Matthew) in addition to the regular stage pollution. Potty humour would become even more prevalent in later seasons however. To complete her contract obligations, Christine appeared only in the first five episodes of this season until she left after the fifth episode. Alasdair Gillis succeeded her as host until he too left towards the end of the season. Matthew Godfrey, Amyas Godfrey, Andrea Byrne, and Alanis Morissette all joined the regular cast.

Season 8 (1987)
By this time, all but four of the second generation cast had already ended their time on the show, and it was supposed to be the final season. Only five episodes were filmed and aired, one of which ("Adoption") was banned for making light of child abuse (in Canada, the "Adoption" episode was edited to remove the "damn" in Senator Prevert's line "You get over here right away, ya damn bureaucrat!", but the episode was eventually pulled because the producers felt the episode's jokes about adoption were in bad taste). This makes this season the shortest season of the show, tied with the season in 1990. Despite the short production order, the show was as popular as ever on Nickelodeon, and re-runs were still broadcast as part of the network's daily programming. Vanessa continued to handle most of the hosting duties, while Adam continued working as both a cast member and a writer on the show. Tone-wise, the show continued its trend towards being more slime-gag and potty humour oriented, with all of the episodes featuring additional stage pollution to the regular slime, water, and pies, and several of the episode topics being chosen specifically for their ability to cater towards toilet humour. An hour-long special was also prepared for home video, but not released. It was known as The Worst of You Can't Do That on Television and included new footage with Adam Reid, Vanessa Lindores, and Doug Plotemy as hosts, as well as footage from 1979–1987.

Season 9 (1989-1990)
After a hiatus, filming on what would become the 1989 season of the show commenced in the fall of 1988 with an almost entirely new cast of kids. Only Amyas Godfrey and Andrea Byrne returned from the 1987 season (and the latter for only one episode), although two other members of the 1986 cast (Rekha Shah and James Tung) returned for one or two episodes and Sidharth Sahay replaced his brother, 1986-87 cast member Vikram. In addition, Vanessa Lindores also returned to guest-host the "Age" episode (which also featured cameos by several other former cast members).  Chris Bickford was made as the official host, although some other kids, including Jill and Amy Stanley, Christian Tessier, and Rekha Shah, also took turns at hosting. Adam Reid and Kevin Kubusheskie became a writer and a producer, respectively, and had occasional cameos. The first episodes of this season premiered concurrently with a tie-in promotion for the 1989 edition of Nickelodeon's Slime-In Sweepstakes (including a commercial introducing some of the "new kids" in which Nick Belcourt, Christian Tessier, Chris Bickford and Amyas Godfrey were all slimed). This season was almost filmed at Nickelodeon Studios in Orlando, Florida, but at the last minute the decision was made to stay at CJOH, although a replica of the link set had been recreated in Florida. The Worst of You Can't Do That on Television was remade (albeit shortened to a half hour) with Chris Bickford, Jennifer Brackenbury, and Christian Tessier as hosts, and released on video in time for the 1989 holiday season.  Les Lye's "doctor" character was also changed to a dentist this season.

Season 10 (1990)
After 11 years in production, You Can't Do That on Television is cancelled. Only five episodes were produced, with production ending in February. Nickelodeon's final Slime-In was also held this season, with the winner being slimed at Nickelodeon Studios in Orlando and not in Ottawa, as the series had already been canceled by then.

References

You Can't Do That on Television
Lists of Nickelodeon television series episodes